Svetlana Viktorovna Babanina (born 4 February 1943) is a retired Soviet swimmer who competed at the 1964 and 1968 Summer Olympics. In 1964, she won bronze medals in the 4 × 100 m medley relay and 200 m individual breaststroke, whereas in 1968 she finished in seventh and sixth place in the 100 m and 200 m breaststroke, respectively. Babanina won the 200 m event at the 1965 Universiade; she competed at the European Championships in 1962 and 1966, but did not medal. Domestically she won five titles: in the 400 m individual medley (1962 and 1963), 4 × 100 m freestyle relay (1963) and 100 m and 200 m breaststroke (1964). In 1964–1965 she set two world records in the 100 m breaststroke (1:17.2 in 1964 and 1:16.5 in 1965).

Personal bests: 
100 m breaststroke – 1:16.5 (1965)
200 m breaststroke – 2:47.2 (1964)
400 m individual medley – 5:40.5 (1965).

References

1943 births
Living people
Russian female freestyle swimmers
Uzbekistani female breaststroke swimmers
Uzbekistani female freestyle swimmers
Uzbekistani female medley swimmers
Russian female breaststroke swimmers
Russian female medley swimmers
Soviet female breaststroke swimmers
Soviet female freestyle swimmers
Soviet female medley swimmers
Olympic swimmers of the Soviet Union
Swimmers at the 1964 Summer Olympics
Swimmers at the 1968 Summer Olympics
Olympic bronze medalists for the Soviet Union
Olympic bronze medalists in swimming
Sportspeople from Tambov
Medalists at the 1964 Summer Olympics
Universiade medalists in swimming
Universiade gold medalists for the Soviet Union
Universiade bronze medalists for the Soviet Union
Medalists at the 1965 Summer Universiade